The Matador is a 2005 black comedy crime film written and directed by Richard Shepard and starring Pierce Brosnan and Greg Kinnear.

The film was released on DVD on July 4, 2006 and on HD DVD on December 19, 2006. Brosnan was nominated for both a Golden Globe Award and a Saturn Award for his performance as disillusioned, unstable hitman Julian Noble.

Plot 
An encounter in the bar of the Mexico City branch of the Camino Real Hotels, between tired businessman Danny Wright, hoping to land a career-saving contract in Mexico, and jaded, falling-apart-at-the-seams assassin Julian Noble, leads them into an awkward friendship. Julian is confronting the immorality of his profession and experiencing a mid-life crisis that caused him to freeze on a job; Danny is fearing that a vitally important deal will fall through and cost him his job. After an uncomfortable-at-times conversation, Danny leaves the bar. Julian apologizes and invites him to see a bullfight. During the show, Julian reveals the kind of work he does, and when Danny is skeptical, takes him through the steps of how to murder a portly spectator in the arena bathroom. Danny is shocked at how easily Julian can get within inches of the man, even though he ends the "tutorial" without going through with the murder.

Later, while at an outdoor cafe, Julian asks Danny to assist him in "facilitating a fatality"; Danny flatly refuses and Julian leaves. On leaving, it appears that Julian has definitively had enough of Danny. However, that evening Julian knocks on Danny's hotel room door, pleading to be let in, wanting to apologize for attempting to involve Danny in his work.  Danny sits within looking undecided, and the scene cuts to black with the sound of glass breaking, not revealing what happened next.

The film picks up again six months later, during the Christmas season. Danny and his wife, Bean are relaxing at their home in Denver when Julian arrives, looking for a place to stay. Danny and Bean have reservations, but decide to let him in. The grateful Julian notices that Danny has framed the bullfight ticket, which touches Julian.That night, he shares the reason for his visit: he needs help with his last job. Julian convinces Danny to go along with the plan because, he tells Danny, "you owe me." They fly to Arizona together to the race courses to kill the target. Julian gets Danny to open a door to set off the alarm so he could turn off the alarm in the future. He then asks Danny to bump into the target so Julian could have a clear shot. Julian is on the stairwell with a sniper rifle. Danny does his part but Julian is unable to take the shot and breaks down. After much internal struggle and with Danny talking him through it, Julian completes the task.

On the plane back from Tucson, Julian reveals that the man he just killed was his long-term employer, Mr. Stick. Having killed him means that now Julian can retire to Greece. Danny is surprised, then amused at Julian's craftiness, but is reminded of Julian's profession when he lightly punches Julian in the shoulder and is quietly warned by Julian, "Don't ever hit me again.", so he immediately apologizes. A split flashback sequence during the flight home (a memory triggered by a statement of Danny's) shows what took place a year prior when Danny let Julian into his hotel room: Danny asked Julian to kill his business opponents. Julian says no as he doesn't think Danny is that type of person and knows Danny will regret it. The flashback ends and they are back on the plane. Danny says " You became my friend that night Julian. You surprised me!" Julian replies "I surprised myself."

Later, Danny and Bean are shown visiting their son's grave, something they do on the anniversary of his death. Julian watches respectfully from a distance, places a brochure for Greece on their windshield, then slips away.

Cast

Production
Although Julian travels to Vienna, Las Vegas, Moscow, Sydney, Budapest, Tucson  and Manila, the film was shot entirely in Mexico City. 

During the commentary for the first deleted scene on the DVD, director Richard Shephard states that the first cut of the film was 2 hours and 10 minutes and was cut down to its current length of 1 hour and 37 minutes.

Critical reaction 
Having been screened at the Sundance, Toronto International, and Chicago International film festivals prior to its release, the film was generally well received by critics. Early reviews praised Pierce Brosnan's performance, as well as the film's unique and provocative premise and themes.

Roger Ebert and Richard Roeper, on their television show At the Movies with Ebert & Roeper, gave it an enthusiastic "two thumbs up," with Ebert praising the movie as "an overlooked gem" and "Pierce Brosnan's best work to date."

, the film holds a 75% approval rating on Rotten Tomatoes, based on 156 reviews, with an average rating of 6.68/10. The critical consensus states that "This humorously amoral, oddball comic thriller features strong performances by Pierce Brosnan and Greg Kinnear as a flamboyant, aging hit-man and an out of work suburban businessman, respectively."

Accolades

Pierce Brosnan was nominated for the Golden Globe Award for Best Actor – Motion Picture Musical or Comedy at the 63rd Golden Globe Awards, although Joaquin Phoenix ultimately won for Walk the Line (2005).

Soundtrack
The soundtrack was released in 2006 on Superb Records.

Track listing
 "Town Called Malice" - The Jam - 2:54
 "El Matador" - Los Fabulosos Cadillacs - 4:35
 "It's Not Unusual" - Tom Jones - 2:00
 "1, 2, 3, 4" - Titan - 4:13
 "Manila Fiasco" - Rolfe Kent - 2:38
 "Garbageman" - The Cramps - 3:35
 "Heat of the Moment" - Asia - 3:50
 "Bahía Blanca" - Ramón Stagnaro - 3:03
 "A Mi Guitarra" - Daniel Indart - 2:49
 "Matador Theme" - Rolfe Kent - 2:42
 "One Night in Mexico" - Rolfe Kent - 2:39
 "In the Wee Small Hours of the Morning" - Dave VanNorden - 3:13
 "No Te Rajes" - Mariachi La Estella ' 3:03
 "All These Things That I've Done" - The Killers - 5:02

References

External links 
 
 
 

2005 films
German action comedy films
Irish action films
British buddy comedy films
2000s English-language films
2000s buddy comedy films
English-language German films
English-language Irish films
American black comedy films
American buddy comedy films
American action comedy films
Estudios Churubusco films
Films set in Colorado
Films set in Mexico
Films shot in Mexico City
British black comedy films
Films scored by Rolfe Kent
Films directed by Richard Shepard
Miramax films
The Weinstein Company films
Irish black comedy films
German black comedy films
2000s American films
2000s British films
Buena Vista International films
2000s German films